Sar Jub (also Romanized as Sar Jūb; also known as Sar Jūb-e Jalāvand, Sar Jūb-e ‘Olyā, Sar Jūb-e Soflá, and Sarju Jalālwand) is a village in Jalalvand Rural District, Firuzabad District, Kermanshah County, Kermanshah Province, Iran. At the 2006 census, its population was 263, in 48 families.

References 

Populated places in Kermanshah County